Polisi Tanzania (Polisi Morogoro) is a Tanzanian football club in Moshi, Kilimanjaro.

The 2015/16 season they are playing in the Tanzanian First Division League. They previously played in the top level of Tanzanian professional football, the Tanzanian Premier League.

Current squad

Managers
2019-2020 - QuaintHD

References

Football clubs in Tanzania
Morogoro
Morogoro